Maicon Assis Brito (born 3 March 1990), commonly known as Maicon Assis, is a Brazilian footballer who plays as a midfielder or forward.

Career
Maicon Assis signed for Brasil de Pelotas after being release by Portuguesa (RJ) in March 2019. He had previously had a loan spell with the club in 2018.

Maicon Assis has played in all four national division of Brazilian football, representing Vasco da Gama in 2012 Campeonato Brasileiro Série A, Brasil de Pelotas in 2018 Campeonato Brasileiro Série B, Santa Cruz in 2018 Campeonato Brasileiro Série C and both Portuguesa (RJ) and Arapongas in Campeonato Brasileiro Série D. He has also had spells in Portugal with Vasco da Gama's partnership side in 2011 and with Trofense in 2013–14.

References

External links

1990 births
Living people
Brazilian footballers
CR Vasco da Gama players
Associação Atlética Portuguesa (RJ) players
Veranópolis Esporte Clube Recreativo e Cultural players
C.D. Trofense players
Associação Portuguesa de Desportos players
Santa Cruz Futebol Clube players
Grêmio Esportivo Brasil players
Campeonato Brasileiro Série A players
Campeonato Brasileiro Série B players
Campeonato Brasileiro Série C players
Campeonato Brasileiro Série D players
Liga Portugal 2 players
Association football forwards
Association football midfielders